Zebronia mahensis is a moth in the family Crambidae. It was described by Thomas Bainbrigge Fletcher in 1910. It is found on the Seychelles, where it has been recorded from Mahé and Silhouette.

References

Maes, 2014. "Notes on the Crambidae of Africa with new synonyms and combinations (Lepidoptera Pyraloidea Crambidae)". Lambillionea. 114, 2, 2014: 139-143

Moths described in 1910
Spilomelinae
Moths of Africa